Soproni Kosárlabda Club, commonly known as Soproni KC or Sopron, is a professional basketball team based in Sopron, Hungary. The team competes in the Hungarian first tier Nemzeti Bajnokság I, and play their home games at the MKB Aréna Sopron, which has a capacity of 2,500.

Honours

Domestic competitions
Nemzeti Bajnokság I/A (National Championship of Hungary)
 Third place (1): 2013–14

Magyar Kupa (National Cup of Hungary)
 Finalist (1): 2014

Season by season

 Cancelled due to the COVID-19 pandemic in Hungary.

Current roster

Depth chart

References

Basketball teams in Hungary
Basketball teams established in 1959
Sport in Sopron
1959 establishments in Hungary